Lew Brantley (August 3, 1937 – May 11, 2004) was an American politician. He served as a Democratic member for the 21st district of the Florida House of Representatives. He also served as a member for the 8th district of the Florida Senate.

Life and career 
Brantley was born in McRae, Georgia.

In 1966, Brantley was elected to the Florida House of Representatives. The next year, he was elected as the first representative for the newly-established 21st district. He served until 1970, when he was succeeded by Bill Birchfield. In the same year, he was elected to represent the 8th district of the Florida Senate, serving until 1978.

Brantley died in May 2004, at the age of 66.

References 

1937 births
2004 deaths
People from McRae, Georgia
Democratic Party Florida state senators
Democratic Party members of the Florida House of Representatives
20th-century American politicians